Rose Nylund is a character from the sitcom television series The Golden Girls and its spin-off, The Golden Palace. She was portrayed by Betty White for 8 years, totalling 204 episodes. 

Rose was supposed to be played by Rue McClanahan, while Blanche Devereaux, one of Rose's roommates, was to be played by White. However, Jay Sandrich, the director of the show, suggested that Betty and Rue switch parts. He felt that Betty would be a better fit for Rose because she had already played Sue Ann Nivens in the television show The Mary Tyler Moore Show, which is similar to the character of Blanche Devereaux. In a January 2017 interview with Katie Couric, White stated she jumped at the opportunity to take the role of Rose, noting she loved the character and describing Rose as "so innocent, not the brightest nickel in the drawer, but funny."

Biography
Rose Lindström is a Norwegian American born in St. Olaf, Minnesota, to a monk named Brother Martin and a 19-year-old girl named Ingrid Kerklavoner, who died giving birth. Brother Martin claimed not to have known about Rose's existence until after she had been placed for adoption. She spent the first eight years of her life at the St. Olaf Orphanage before being adopted by Gunter and Alma Lindström (although she erroneously says "Gunter and Alma Nylund" when retelling the story). Rose explains that she was adopted after she was left on a doorstep in a basket with some hickory-smoked cheese and some crackers "that didn't go with anything". She used to daydream about her birth father, feeling that Bob Hope was, in fact, her birth father, and she wrote the comedian many letters whenever she fell on tough times.

It is stated that she was valedictorian in her high school graduation, fourth out of nineteen, and was chosen valedictorian because she drew the longest straw. It is revealed that Rose attended St. Paul Business School, Rockport Community College, and St. Gustaf University, but also that she had never graduated from high school due to a case of mono. Nevertheless, she was voted "most likely to get stuck in a tuba" by one of her graduating classes. Her parents did not allow her to date until she was a high school senior, and between then and her wedding day, she had fifty-six boyfriends. Rose fell in love with Charlie Nylund, a salesman, and they later married. Rose met Charlie when she was seven and he was eight, and he sold her an insurance policy for her red wagon. She and Charlie had a long and happy marriage, and a very active sex life, to the extent that she was unaware of the existence of a popular television show called I Love Lucy. Over the course of the series, Rose names five children: Brigit, Gunilla, Kirsten, Adam, and Charlie Jr. Rose also has two granddaughters by Kirsten - Charley (named for Kirsten's father) and another unnamed, mentioned in the episode where Rose had her heart attack. Of her children, only Brigit and Kirsten appeared on the show, although Kirsten was played by two different actresses.

Charlie died of a heart attack while he and Rose were making love, and this gave Rose a fear of sexual intimacy for several years thereafter. Years later, a boyfriend named Al Beatty (Richard Roat) dies in a similar fashion. In one episode Rose confides to Blanche and Dorothy that she and Charlie made love twice every day, once in the morning before breakfast and then once after dinner, getting Blanche to remark "No wonder you still mourn that man".

Charlie and Rose's marriage length is unclear. Although it was mentioned in the 1985 pilot episode that Charlie had been dead for 15 years, in the first-season episode "Job Hunting", Rose says that she had been a housewife for 32 years when Charlie died in 1980. In the same episode, Rose is 55 years old in 1985, which would put her birth year in 1930. This would make her 63 when The Golden Palace goes off the air in 1993.

Charlie is the only spouse of the four women on The Golden Girls that the audience never sees. In an episode of The Golden Palace, a man said to bear an incredibly strong resemblance to Charlie makes an appearance; the look-alike is played by Eddie Albert.

Rose is laid off from her job at the grief counselling centre in season 1, and briefly works as a waitress at the Fountain Roc Coffee Shop before being rehired at the counselling centre shortly after. Later on in the series, Rose suffers financial difficulties when her late husband's employer files for bankruptcy and her pension is cut off. She suffers from age discrimination in her attempts to get a new job, but her luck changes when she gets a position as assistant to TV consumer reporter Enrique Más. Rose finally finds a significant romance with college professor Miles Webber, though their relationship is put through a serious strain when it is revealed that Miles is actually a former mobster accountant named Nicholas Carbone, and a participant in the witness protection program. His former employer, "The Cheese Man," begins dating Rose in order to get information on Miles's whereabouts. Eventually The Cheese Man is apprehended, Rose and Miles resume their lives together, and all goes well for approximately the next year. In season 7, Rose and Miles consider marriage, but ultimately decided against rushing into anything. Their relationship later ends permanently during an episode of The Golden Palace when Rose discovers that Miles loves and subsequently marries another woman.

St. Olaf
Rose frequently tells other women various stories, which they find to be annoying, of her hometown, St. Olaf. Rose usually begins each story with, "Back in St. Olaf..." According to her, St. Olaf is a Norwegian farming settlement in northern Minnesota, known on local license plates as "Big Statue Country". During the show's seven-year run, St. Olaf is seen only twice in flashbacks, and once when the ladies visit during an episode in which Rose was nominated for St. Olaf's Woman of the Year award.

One of St. Olaf's chief attractions is a giant black hole, which the townspeople enjoy standing around and looking at - which prompts Dorothy to refer to St. Olaf sarcastically as the real "entertainment capital of the world." St. Olafians also celebrate various oddly-themed festivals. St. Olaf appears to be a bilingual town with a significant amount of unique vocabulary (that may be specific to the area and not appearing in standard Norwegian). One of the unique attractions of St. Olaf is Mt. Losenbauden, similar to Mount Rushmore, except that it features the faces of losing presidential candidates; Adlai Stevenson is featured twice because he lost twice.

It is suggested by Rose's stories that St. Olaf is populated almost entirely by idiots. In the season three episode "Mother's Day", Rose encounters a travelling woman named Anna, who says about St. Olaf, "I don't mean to say that everyone there is an idiot, but it just seemed that, per capita, they have more than their share." When Rose says that her children realized it would be cheaper for her to visit the family than it would for the family to visit her, Anna happily replies, "They figured that out, and they live in St. Olaf? You must be very proud!" Additional indications include the revelation that St. Olaf has an emergency fund for the sole purpose of erecting statues, that the local beauty pageant was pigs-only until humans were first allowed to compete in the 1940s, and as of the 1980s, no St. Olafian had read all three books in the local library.

Rose has the ability, which she calls "The Gift", to speak with animals and hear their conversations.  This was initially thought to be a delusion of hers, until Dorothy was discovered to have this ability in season 2.  It is never brought up again.

Additional appearances
Outside The Golden Girls and The Golden Palace, Rose appears on three episodes of Empty Nest: "Strange Bedfellows", "Rambo of Neiman Marcus" and "Dr. Weston and Mr. Hyde". She also appears on the Nurses episode "Begone with the Wind".

References

External links

Adoptee characters in television
The Golden Girls characters
Fictional characters from Minnesota
Television characters introduced in 1985
Fictional hoteliers
American female characters in television
American sitcom television characters
Fictional painkiller addicts